Frank Wearne (May 27, 1913, Belle Plaine, Iowa – February 21, 1985 Los Angeles, California) was an American racecar driver. He grew up in Altadena, California and began his racing career in roadsters on the Jeffries Ranch track in Burbank. He moved on to race at the Culver City Legion Speedway dirt track and Legion Ascot Speedway. After Ascot closed, Wearne raced successfully in the Pacific Northwest, then headed to the Midwest. An Indianapolis 500 specialist, he participated in the race 7 times, with a best finish of 7th in 1940.  He only made two Championship Car starts in races other than the Indy 500. After retiring from racing, he worked at a brewery for 20 years

Indy 500 results

References

1913 births
1985 deaths
American racing drivers
Indianapolis 500 drivers
People from Belle Plaine, Iowa
Racing drivers from Iowa